The Nomoi Islands, also known as the Mortlock Islands, are a group of three atolls in the state of Chuuk, Federated States of Micronesia.

Islands
The Mortlock Islands are the islands Ettal, Namoluk, Ta, Nama, Oneop, Losap, Moch, Picemwar, Satowan, Lukunor (Likinioch), and Kuttu (KuKuttu). Losap, Nama, and Namoluk are clustered to the northwest of the other islands and are also called the Upper Mortlock Islands or Eastern Islands. 

Satawan, the southern atoll, is the largest. Both Etal, to the north, and Lukunor to the northeast are significantly smaller.

History
They were sighted by the Spanish expedition of Álvaro de Saavedra in 1528.

Captain James Mortlock was sailing from Port Jackson to Whampoa in Young William when he rediscovered two sets of islands on 19 and 27 November 1795. Confusingly, both were later called Mortlock Islands.

Ethnography

The Mortlock Islands remain more traditional than the inner lagoon islands. The Mortlockese language is similar to the normal Lagoon language but spoken and pronounced differently.

See also
Takuu Atoll

References

Islands of Chuuk State
Atolls of the Federated States of Micronesia